The SIL Open Font License (or OFL in short) is one of the major open font licenses, which allows embedding, or "bundling", of the font in commercially sold products.

OFL is a free and open source license. 
It was created by SIL International, the organization behind Ethnologue.

History 
The Open Font License was created by SIL International employees Victor Gaultney and Nicolas Spalinger. Gaultney had previously designed the Gentium font and was unsatisfied with existing font licenses. 

The Open Font License was designed for use with many of SIL's Unicode fonts, including Gentium Plus, Charis SIL, and Andika. The license was in a "public review" stage between 2005 and 2007 and version 1.1 was published in February 2007.

Prior to the release of the OFL, the Bitstream Vera fonts had been released in 2003 under most of the same terms and conditions.

Open-source fonts are a popular choice among designers, and most open-source fonts utilize the Open Font License. For example, it was used to license a font made by the US government.

Terms 

The Open Font License is a free software license, and as such permits the fonts to be used, modified, and distributed freely (so long as the resulting fonts remain under the Open Font License). However, the copyright holder may declare the font's name as being a "Reserved Font Name", which modified versions then cannot bear. (This includes subsetting for web fonts.) The license permits covered fonts to be freely embedded in documents under any terms. The only stipulation is that fonts cannot be sold on their own, though they may be included in software bundles for sale.

The license is considered free by the Free Software Foundation (FSF) and the Debian project. FSF states that although the requirement that the font be bundled with software rather than being distributed alone is unusual, that a simple hello world program is enough to satisfy the license's requirement, and that it is therefore harmless.

See also 
GPL font exception
Ubuntu Font License

References

External links 
 SIL Open Font License version 1.1
 SIL Open Font License FAQ
 Linux.com: SIL Open Font License revised 

 
Free and open-source software licenses
Copyleft software licenses